Dräger is a German company based in Lübeck which makes breathing and protection equipment, gas detection and analysis systems, and noninvasive patient monitoring technologies. Customers include hospitals, fire departments and diving companies.

History

The first patent was taken out for a reduction device for using carbon dioxide to dispense beer. In 1902 Heinrich Dräger's son Bernhard entered the management; from then on, the company was named Drägerwerk Heinr. und Bernh. Dräger. Since 1970, Drägerwerk has been a public limited company, or Aktiengesellschaft (AG) in German.

In 2003, the aerospace division was sold to Cobham plc.  In July 2006, it was announced that Draeger Aerospace GmbH had been acquired by B/E Aerospace, Inc.

As a result of the COVID-19 pandemic, demand for the Draeger's ventilators skyrocketed. In February 2020, the production capacity was doubled and is to be doubled again (as of March 2020). The German federal government commissioned the company with 10,000 devices, which were to be delivered in the course of 2020. Ultimately, only 1,557 devices were delivered, and the rest canceled. An even larger part of the production is sold abroad. In addition, the production of respiratory masks was doubled.
According to an article in New York Times, Xavier Becerra (who has selected by then-President-elect Joseph R. Biden Jr. as his nominee for the Secretary of Health and Human Services in the US), made the statement that they plan to order approximately 1 Million medical ventilators whenever he takes office.  In the course of this statement, he named Dräger under the potential suppliers, regarding to fight against Covid19.

Dräger Medical GmbH

Dräger Medical is a manufacturer of medical equipment. The company offers products and services including Emergency Care, Perioperative Care, Critical Care, Perinatal Care
and Home Care. With headquarters in Lübeck, Germany, Dräger Medical employs nearly 14,000 people worldwide, around half of whom work in customer sales & services. R&D and production are located in Lübeck, Germany; Best, Netherlands; Richmond Hill, ON, Canada; Telford, PA, USA; Andover, MA, USA; and Shanghai, China. The company has sales and service subsidiaries in almost 50 countries and is represented in more than 190 countries.

Dräger Safety GmbH
Dräger Safety GmbH is a manufacturer of personal protection and gas detection technology, and a supplier of safety systems for industry, fire prevention, mining and other hazardous areas. The products and services from Dräger Safety warn and protect people from airborne pollutants and enable people to breathe reliably even in extreme situations.

Dräger claims to have longstanding experience, especially in the fields of gas management, gas flow control, gas monitoring and gas measurement. 
The current product range encompasses respiratory protective equipment for firefighters, miners and other industrial personnel as well as complete air filter and air supply systems, portable and fixed gas detection and warning systems, devices for on-site or laboratory contaminant analysis, and instruments to determine a person's breath-alcohol concentration.

Dräger combines the practical use of equipment with, for example, consultancy services, training, maintenance, service and commissioning.  Represented in over 100 countries, the company has 40 subsidiaries and, with its 3,600 employees, achieved global sales of €557.8 million in 2005 (EBIT: €40.7 million). 
Dräger Safety operates production plants in Germany, Great Britain, USA, Sweden, South Africa and China.

Dräger Safety faces heavy competition from other manufacturers of safety equipment such as Sensidyne, LP. Also, the company's competitors include Mine Safety Appliances, Industrial Scientific Corporation and RAE Systems.

Dräger supports the German Firefighting Sports Federation in the German firefighting fitness badge.

Colorimetric gas detector tubes
Dräger was one of a few companies who were early pioneers of colorimetric gas detector tubes (also known as "detector tubes") used to measure the concentration of gases present. In a typical colorimetric gas detector tube a known volume of air is pumped through a tube using a pump. The tube typically has a layer which indicates the analyte by changing colour, depending on the amount of the gas which has passed through the tube the length of the zone which has changed colour will be different. Today colorimetric gas detector tubes are used throughout industry as a low-cost and easy-to-use tool for detecting the presence of gases and are available from a wide range of manufacturers.

An early limitation of detector tubes is that they were designed to detect a single known gas or vapor. Advancements in the design and capability of detector tubes came with the introduction of such tools as the HazMat kit. The specialty kits are designed for use by hazardous material response teams in determining what gases or vapors are present through using a "stack" of colorimetric material that change color based upon the presence of an organic or inorganic gas.

Alcohol screening kits 
Dräger developed their first alcohol screening kit in 1953 when some employees came into work hungover following a party the night before. It was originally developed using silicon crystals, where a breath sample was passed through these silicon crystals, if there was alcohol in this breath sample, a chemical reaction would occur resulting in the crystals changing colour. This particular method is still used today to create "single use breathalyzers."

Dräger's first digital display Alcohol Screening Kit was developed in 1980. Later they developed a breathalyzer that uses a fuel sensor. Many of Drägers breathalyzers have United Kingdom home office approval, which means they can be used by the police in a variety of countries, including the UK.

Diving equipment

In 1912 Drägerwerk developed standard diving dress which did not need surface supplied breathing gas via a diver's umbilical, as it used a self contained gas supply came from a rebreather. Two versions were available, one for oxygen to 20 metres, and the other for nitrox to 40 metres. The semi-closed circuit used the injected gas to circulate the gas in the helmet through a scrubber, providing a very low work of breathing in comparison with most other rebreathers which used the lungs of the diver to circulate gas in the loop. The bubikopf helmet was designed for use with this system. The rebreather loop hoses connected to the back of the helmet below the overhanging part, and led from there to the back-mounted scrubber.

Since 1941 Hans Hass used bag-on-back rebreathers for scuba diving, originally built by Dräger for self-rescue of submarine crews (Tauchretter; like the Davis Escape Set). The first Dräger-Tauchretter  had been built in 1907. In 1926 the Bade-Tauchretter was brought into service for rescuing drowning swimmers.

Dräger manufactured the popular Atlantis, Ray and Dolphin line of sport diving semi-closed-circuit nitrox rebreathers. It also makes the LAR-5 and LAR-6 military oxygen rebreathers, and the LAV-7 military rebreather which is switchable between closed-circuit and semi-closed-circuit.

Atlantis/Dolphin 
 

The Dräger Dolphin, originally Atlantis is a semi-closed circuit nitrox rebreather for recreational diving using a constant mass flow injection system.

Ray 
The Dräger Ray is a semi-closed circuit recreational diving rebreather designed to use standard nitrox breathing gas mixtures.

Construction

Harness and assembly

The soft harness has integrated over-the-shoulder counterlungs and buoyancy compensator bladder. The harness also carries a moderate sized scrubber canister on the upper back, and a single transversely mounted cylinder on the lower back. The Ray delivers a constant mass flow of gas to the breathing circuit through a Dräger Shark regulator and a metering orifice which is chosen from a small range, and which must be matched to the chosen gas mixture.

The whole unit excepting cylinders is supplied in a carrying case.

Breathing loop
The standard unit provides a simple  (DSV) with mouthpiece, but an optional DSV connects to the Dräger Panorama full-face mask using the standard Dräger P-port connection system which is also used for the connections between the breathing hoses and counterlungs, and between the counterlungs and scrubber canister. The back mounted scrubber has axial flow, and has an auxiliary P-port on the base, which can be used to connect an optional oxygen monitor cell.

The automatic diluent valve is combined with the metering orifice as a single unit which plugs into a counterlung using a standard P-port connection.

Gas supply
The standard cylinder supplied with the unit is a 4-litre 200 bar steel cylinder, but it can also carry an 8-litre steel cylinder, which is about the same length but larger diameter. Standard open circuit bailout uses a Shark demand valve on the same first stage used for the metering and ADV. There is also a low pressure hose to supply the buoyancy compensator.

Specifications

Recreational semi-closed circuit rebreather with constant mass flow dosage and demand gas supply, open circuit bailout on independent second stage.
Year of design: 2000
Scrubber capacity: approximately 1,25 kg
Width: 450 mm
Height: 600 mm
Weight: approximately 15 kg
Gas supply cylinder: 4 litre 200 bar (standard)
Diving depth: 
6 msw (100% oxygen)
22 msw (EAN 50)
30 msw (EAN 40)
40 msw (EAN 32)
Dive duration: approximately 70 minutes (EAN 50)
Gas mixes: EAN 32, EAN 40, EAN 50, 100% Oxygen (require dedicated components - fixed orifice in ADV valve block)
Flow rate (approximate): 
EAN 40: 12 litre/minute 
EAN 50: 8.25 litre/minute

High altitude breathing equipment 
Dräger made the high-altitude oxygen sets used by the 1952 Swiss Mount Everest expedition (the second (autumn) expedition), and John Hunt was able to have adaptors made so that the 1953 British expedition could use oxygen from tanks the Swiss had left behind, particularly for their bottled oxygen "sleeping sets".

See also

References

External links

 
 
Rebreathers Diving Center - Dolphin

Companies based in Schleswig-Holstein
Technology companies established in 1889
Diving engineering
Diving equipment manufacturers
Gas sensors
German brands
Draeger
Draeger
Rebreather makers
1889 establishments in Germany
Companies in the TecDAX